"Gwendolyne", sometimes spelt "Gwendoline", is a song composed and recorded by Spanish singer Julio Iglesias, co-written by Leo Johns. It is best known as the  entry at the Eurovision Song Contest 1970, held in Amsterdam.

The single was also one of the final records to be issued in the by then obsolete 78 RPM format, only being released in that format in Columbia.

Background
The song is a ballad, with both music and lyrics co-written by Iglesias himself, written about his first girlfriend, the titular Gwendolyne, a French girl whom he met at the age of 20 while still a law student and a goalkeeper for Spanish football team Real Madrid Castilla. In 1963, Iglesias was involved in a near-fatal car accident, which ended his football career, left him in rehabilitation for considerable time and indirectly led him to start learning the guitar, as a means of physical therapy.

Iglesias began composing his own music; in 1968 he entered and won the Benidorm International Song Festival with the song "La vida sigue igual" ("Life goes on the same way") and shortly thereafter he signed with the Spanish branch of Columbia Records. His participation in the Eurovision Song Contest in March 1970, held in Amsterdam, was his first major international TV appearance. "Gwendolyne" went on to become his first number 1 single in Spain and was also a modest commercial success in a few other countries in Europe and South America. His international breakthrough single "Un canto a Galicia" ("A song to Galicia") followed in 1972.

Iglesias recorded "Gwendolyne" in five languages: Spanish, English, French, German and Italian. The song was also the title track to his second Spanish studio album, released in 1970, and subsequently also included on his eponymous international debut album in 1972. The song reached number one in Spain.

Eurovision
The song was performed ninth on the night, following 's David Alexandre Winter with "Je suis tombé du ciel" and preceding 's Dominique Dussault with "Marlène". At the close of voting, it had received 8 points, placing 4th in a field of 12.

It was succeeded as Spanish entry at the 1971 contest by Karina with "En un mundo nuevo".

References

Eurovision songs of Spain
Spanish-language songs
Eurovision songs of 1970
Julio Iglesias songs
Number-one singles in Spain
1970 songs
Columbia Graphophone Company singles
1970 singles